Quinnipiac University is a private university in Hamden, Connecticut. The university grants undergraduate, graduate, and professional degrees. It also hosts the Quinnipiac University Polling Institute.

History

What became Quinnipiac University was founded in 1929 by Samuel W. Tator, a business professor and politician. Phillip Troup, a Yale College graduate, was another founder, and became its first president until his death in 1939. Tator's wife, Irmagarde Tator, a Mount Holyoke College graduate, also played a major role in the fledgling institution's nurturing as its first bursar. Additional founders were E. Wight Bakke, who later became a professor of economics at Yale, and Robert R. Chamberlain, who headed a furniture company in his name.

The new institution was conceived in reaction to Northeastern University's abandonment of its New Haven, Connecticut, program at the onset of the Great Depression. Originally, it was located in New Haven and called the "Connecticut College of Commerce". On opening its doors in 1929, it enrolled under 200, and its first graduating class comprised only eight students. At the time, it awarded only associate's degrees. In 1935, the college changed its name to the "Junior College of Commerce".

From 1943 to 1945, the college closed, as nearly its entire student body was drafted into World War II. Upon re-opening, the college's enrollment nearly quadrupled to approximately 800 students.

In 1951, the institution was renamed "Quinnipiac College", in honor of the Quinnipiac Indian tribe that once inhabited Greater New Haven. That same year, Quinnipiac began to confer bachelor's degrees. In 1952, Quinnipiac expanded its curriculum, relocated to a larger campus in New Haven, and also assumed administrative control of Larson College, a private women's college.

In 1966, having outgrown its campus in New Haven, Quinnipiac moved to its current campus in the Mount Carmel section of Hamden, Connecticut, at the foot of Sleeping Giant Park. During the 1970s, Quinnipiac began to offer master's degrees in a variety of disciplines.

Until the 1990s, Quinnipiac remained primarily a commuter college with only a regional reputation; however, that changed during the next decade. In 1995, the University of Bridgeport's law school migrated to Quinnipiac, and the Quinnipiac School of Law Center was dedicated.

On July 1, 2000, the college officially changed its name to "Quinnipiac University" to reflect its relatively new breadth in academic offerings. That same year, Quinnipiac University received accreditation by AACSB.

Student journalism controversy

In 2007 and 2008, Quinnipiac briefly drew national attention over the university's control over student publications and students' speech. In the fall 2007 semester, junior Jason Braff, then-editor of the Quinnipiac Chronicle, the official newspaper of the school, openly criticized a university policy that forbade the Chronicle from publishing news online before the content was published in the weekly print edition.  Braff wrote an editorial about the policy and also gave an interview to the local Waterbury paper, Republican-American, criticizing it. Manuel Carreiro, Quinnipiac's vice president and dean of students, then sent a letter to Braff in November, telling him that his public disagreement with school policies would "seriously place your position and organization at risk with the university." Braff received an $8,000 annual stipend for his position, and the university said that its employees have more of a responsibility than other students to uphold policies. However, Lynn Bushnell, QU's vice president for public affairs, denied threatening to fire Braff for disagreeing with school policies. Braff and the Chronicle staff were also openly critical of a public relations policy requiring all news media inquiries and questions (including those from the Chronicle) for administrators to be sent, via e-mail, to the university's public relations department.

Quinnipiac officials eventually decided that making the Chronicle independent from the university was the best idea. The school set forth a plan of action, which included the university appointing editors for the 2008–2009 academic year. Angry with this plan, Braff and other staff agreed to leave the Chronicle at the end of the spring 2008 semester, and all applicants for the editor positions withdrew their applications.

Former Chronicle staff members came back in fall 2008 with Quad News, an independent newspaper with only a website and no print edition. Plans were to incorporate Quad News as its own business venture run on advertising revenue. Quad News immediately faced opposition from the university. Staff members learned in September that university officials had instructed all varsity coaches, staff and athletes not to speak to Quad News reporters. Shortly after, officials threatened to shut down the university's chapter of the Society of Professional Journalists (SPJ), claiming that they violated school policy by using their meetings as a cover for Quad News meetings. The Quad News staff had met at two SPJ meetings, after the university took away the meeting reservation for Quad News, citing the fact that the organization was not a university-recognized club. Quad News promptly stopped their meetings with SPJ. The move prompted a public letter from national SPJ leaders, expressing concern over the university's actions.
Both staffs recognized the other publication as legitimate.

2010 title IX discrimination case
On July 21, 2010, a federal judge ruled that Quinnipiac violated Title IX of the Civil Rights Act of 1964 by failing to provide equal treatment to women's athletic teams. The judge, Stefan Underhill, determined that Quinnipiac's decision to eliminate the women's volleyball team as well as its attempt to treat cheerleading as a competitive sport and its manipulation of reporting with regard to the numbers of male and female athletes amounted to unlawful discrimination against female students. Underhill ruled that competitive cheerleading was currently too underdeveloped and unorganized and then ordered that the school maintain its volleyball program for the 2010–11 season.

2015 ADA discrimination case 
In 2015, the university reached a settlement with the federal government over allegations that the university violated the Americans with Disabilities Act (ADA) by "placing a student who had been diagnosed with depression on a mandatory medical leave of absence without first considering options for the student's continued enrollment." The university agreed to pay the former student over $32,000 to pay off her student loan and compensate her for "emotional distress, pain and suffering". The university also had agreed to implement a new policy of nondiscrimination against applicants or students on the basis of disability, examine changes that will allow students with mental health disabilities to participate in educational programs while seeking treatment for mental health conditions, and provide additional ADA training for all staff.

Academics
Quinnipiac offers 58 undergraduate majors and 22 graduate programs, including Juris Doctor and medical doctor programs. Its Frank H. Netter MD School of Medicine admitted 60 students to its first class in 2013. Quinnipiac University is accredited by the New England Commission of Higher Education.

In 2021, 72.5% of undergraduate applicants were accepted with matriculated students having an average GPA of 3.47. Quinnipiac is “test optional” for standardized tests for undergraduate applicants, but encourages submitting SAT or ACT scores, or both. For those submitting scores, the average SAT score was 1175 and average ACT score was 26. Test scores are required for Quinnipiac's Accelerated Dual-Degree Bachelor's/JD (3+3) and Dual-Degree BS/MHS in Physician Assistant (4+27 months) programs, or for those that have been homeschooled.

The university operates several media outlets, including a professionally run commercial radio station, WATX, founded by journalist and Quinnipiac professor Lou Adler. The university also operates a student-run FM radio station WQAQ, which concurrently streams on the Internet. An award-winning student-run television station, Q30 Television, is streamed online. Also, a student-produced newspaper, the Chronicle, established in 1929, publishes 2,500 copies every Wednesday. Students also run a literary magazine, the Montage, a yearbook, the Summit, the Quinnipiac Bobcats Sports Network (an online sports-focused broadcast), and the Quinnipiac Barnacle (a parody news organization). Unaffiliated with the school, but run by students, is also an online newspaper, the Quad News.

Quinnipiac is home to one of the world's largest collections of art commemorating the Great Irish Famine. The collection is contained in Ireland’s Great Hunger Museum just off the Mount Carmel Campus.

In May 2014, Quinnipiac laid off 16 full-time but non-tenured faculty, with 11 of those from the College of Arts and Sciences, with no advance notice of the staff reduction.  The cuts followed several years of a "stalled hiring" and a faculty salary freeze.  The layoffs were mostly in departments that had experienced reduced enrollment in recent years, and enrollment was expected to be down by 12 percent in the fall 2014 term.

Rankings 

Quinnipiac is 153rd in the U.S. News & World Report 2020 rankings of national universities.  For 2021, U.S. News & World Report ranked the physician assistant school 15th nationwide, the law school 122nd, the medical school 94–122, and the business school 99–131. 

Zippia name Quinnipiac University as the No. 1 college in the United States for getting a job in 2021.

Campuses
Quinnipiac University consists of three campuses: the Mount Carmel campus off of Mount Carmel Avenue in Hamden; the York Hill campus off of Sherman Avenue in Hamden, and the North Haven Campus in North Haven, just north of New Haven, Connecticut.

The oldest of these campuses is the Mount Carmel Campus, at the foot of Sleeping Giant State Park. The Arnold Bernhard Library, Carl Hansen Student Center, university administration, and many of the student residences are found on this campus.

The York Hill Campus, located on a hill about a half-mile from the Mount Carmel Campus, began with the development of the M&T Bank Arena (formerly People’s United Arena). In 2010 this was joined by a new student center as well as expanded parking and residence facilities as part of a $300 million expansion of the  campus. York Hill is a "green" campus, making use of renewable energy and environmentally friendly resources, including one of the first major wind farms integrated into a university campus.

For statistical reporting purposes, the Mount Carmel and York Hill campuses were listed together as the Quinnipiac University census-designated place prior to the 2020 census.

In 2007, Quinnipiac acquired a  campus in North Haven, Connecticut, from Anthem Blue Cross Blue Shield, and has been gradually converting it for use by graduate programs at the university.

Quinnipiac University opened the Frank H. Netter M.D. School of Medicine in 2013.

Buildings and landmarks
The current buildings on the Mount Carmel campus are:

 Carl Hansen Student Center – This facility serves as the home to the student government offices, WQAQ-FM radio station, the Chronicle and many student organizations. The student bookstore, main dining hall, campus post office facility, and a branch of M&T Bank  are located there as well. Renovated and expanded in 2012, it is home to a number of new meeting, multipurpose, and media rooms for use by fraternity and sorority life members as well as other student organizations.
 Arnold Bernhard Library – The library is named for Arnold Bernhard, the founder and former chief executive officer of Value Line, Inc. Bernhard's son made the library renovation possible by donating $1 million for the project and an additional $3 million for the university's endowment in 1997. The donation was the largest in the university's history. The signature clock tower was replaced during the renovation which changed the icon of the school, which was a rocket ship spire, to a more conservative, modern tower. The computer help desk was relocated to the library. The learning center, renamed the "learning commons", includes a student tutoring program.
 Ed McMahon Mass Communications Center – Named for the television announcer and sidekick, who was a long-term financial supporter of the school, the center is a media production facility equipped with up-to-date technology for hands-on training in all aspects of radio, television, journalism and multimedia production. The HDTV studio provides students with a professional environment for creating television programming.
 Clarice L. Buckman Center and Theater – Commonly called the "Buckman Center," the building houses a theater used for drama and music performances, classrooms, rehearsal space for theater students, as well as science laboratories.
 Echlin Center – Home to the offices of undergraduate admissions, and financial aid. The second floor houses faculty offices, and two programs in the School of Health Sciences; Athletic Training and Biomedical Science
 Lender School of Business Center – Fully accredited by the Association to Advance Collegiate Schools of Business (AACSB) International, the longest standing, accrediting agency for business programs in the world. The school of business was also included in the 2011 edition of Princeton Review's "Best 300 Business Schools" and in Bloomberg Businessweek's "Top 100 Undergraduate Business Schools" for 2011.
 Tator Hall – Part of the student center, it has multiple classrooms and labs, including some Department of Engineering classrooms.
 The Dean Robert W. Evans College of Arts and Sciences Center – Composed of three separate building surrounding a quad. CAS 1 and CAS 3 are both three floors and contain classrooms, seminar rooms, and faculty offices. CAS 2 is now the Center of Religion, and opened in the fall of 2017. It has a student lounge, meeting room, kitchen, and a chapel.
Center for Communications and Engineering – Houses the School of Communications, the School of Engineering, and the Mount Carmel Auditorium. The building also houses the Office of Multicultural and Global Engagement, the Center of Psychological Science, Academic Affairs, plus faculty and administrative offices.

Quinnipiac Polling Institute

Quinnipiac's polling institute receives national recognition for its independent surveys of residents throughout the United States. It conducts public opinion polls on politics and public policy as a public service as well as for academic research.
The poll has been cited by major news outlets throughout North America and Europe, including The Washington Post, Fox News, USA Today, The New York Times, CNN, and Reuters.

The polling operation began informally in 1988 in conjunction with a marketing class. It became formal in 1994 when the university hired a CBS News analyst to assess the data being gained.  It subsequently focused on the Northeastern states, gradually expanding during presidential elections to cover swing states as well.  The institute receives funding from the university, with its phone callers generally being work study students or local residents.  The polls have been rated highly by FiveThirtyEight for accuracy in predicting primary and general elections. In 2018 Politico called the Quinnipiac poll "the most significant player among a number of schools that have established a national polling footprint."

Greek life
Quinnipiac is home to seven fraternities and nine sororities.

Fraternities
 Delta Upsilon
 Delta Tau Delta
 Pi Kappa Phi
 Zeta Beta Tau
 Beta Theta Pi
 Alpha Sigma Phi
Phi Gamma Delta
Delta Chi

Sororities
Alpha Chi Omega
Alpha Delta Pi
Alpha Kappa Alpha
Kappa Alpha Theta
Phi Sigma Sigma
Sigma Gamma Rho
Kappa Delta
Chi Omega
Gamma Phi Beta
Delta Delta Delta
Pi Beta Phi

The National Panhellenic Conference is an umbrella organization which was created in 1902 for 26 women's sororities.  The National Panhellenic Conference at Quinnipiac University serves as an advocate for the sororities involved in the conference with the campus and community.  The Panhellenic Conference at Quinnipiac University includes Alpha Chi Omega, Alpha Delta Pi, Kappa Alpha Theta, Phi Sigma Sigma, Kappa Delta, and Chi Omega.

Athletics

The Quinnipiac Bobcats, previously the Quinnipiac Braves, comprise the school's athletic teams. They play in NCAA Division I in the Metro Atlantic Athletic Conference, except for the men's and women's ice hockey teams, which are part of ECAC Hockey, and the women's field hockey team, which joined Big East Conference starting with the 2016 season.

There are seven men's varsity sports and 14 women's varsity sports, with no football team.

The team with the largest following on campus and in the area is the men's ice hockey team under established coach Rand Pecknold, which has been nationally ranked at times; during the 2009–2010 season they entered the top ten of the national polls for the first time. The team was the number-one nationally ranked hockey program for parts of the 2012–2013 season, reaching the Frozen Four for the first time in the program's history. They advanced to the national championship, ultimately falling to rival Yale.

The Quinnipiac women's ice hockey program had their most success in the 2009–10 NCAA Division I women's ice hockey season. Quinnipiac University added a women's golf and women's rugby team in the 2010–11 academic year.

In the late 2000s the men's basketball team gained a greater following under new head coach Tom Moore, a disciple of UConn Huskies men's basketball coach Jim Calhoun. Both men's and women's ice hockey and basketball teams play at the $52 million People's United Center, opened in 2007. The women's lacrosse team has also been quite strong. Men's cross country captured 4 NEC titles in 5 years between 2004 and 2008. The athletics program has been under pressures common to other universities, and at the close of the 2008–2009 academic year, men's golf, men's outdoor track, men's indoor track and women's volleyball were dropped as a cost-cutting measure, although the last of these was restored (as a result of a Title IX suit).

Notable alumni
Sam Anas – professional ice hockey player
Bryce Van Brabant – professional ice hockey player
Reid Cashman – college and professional ice hockey coach
Ryan Cleckner – former Army sniper and veteran activist
Connor Clifton – professional ice hockey player
Evan Conti – American-Israeli professional basketball player and college basketball coach
John Delaney – college baseball coach
William D. Euille – former mayor of Alexandria, Virginia
Mary-Jane Foster – co-founder of the Bridgeport Bluefish
Jared Grasso – college basketball coach
Freddy Hall – professional soccer goalkeeper
Eric Hartzell – professional ice hockey goalie
Dorit Kemsley – Real Housewives of Beverly Hills star
Themis Klarides – deputy minority leader of the Connecticut House of Representatives
Chelsea Laden - star of Destination Fear on the Travel Channel. 
Murray Lender – former businessman and CEO of Lender's Bagels
Ilona Maher - Olympic women’s rugby player
Ann Marie McNamara – food safety pioneer
Molly Qerim – sports anchor and moderator for ESPN's First Take
Carley Shimkus – reporter and co-host for Fox News
Devon Toews – professional ice hockey defenseman
Arnold Voketaitis – former bass-baritone  opera singer and teacher
William C. Weldon – former CEO of Johnson & Johnson
Turk Wendell – Major League Baseball player

References

External links

 

 
Buildings and structures in Hamden, Connecticut
Educational institutions established in 1929
Private universities and colleges in Connecticut
North Haven, Connecticut
Universities and colleges in New Haven County, Connecticut
1929 establishments in Connecticut
Census-designated places in New Haven County, Connecticut
Census-designated places in Connecticut